The following is a list of football stadiums in Northern Ireland, ordered by capacity. The minimum required capacity is 1,000.

See also
List of stadiums in Ireland by capacity
List of English football stadiums by capacity
List of Scottish football stadiums by capacity
List of stadiums in Wales by capacity
List of association football stadiums in the Republic of Ireland
List of Gaelic Athletic Association stadiums
List of stadiums in Ireland
List of British stadiums by capacity
List of European stadiums by capacity
List of association football stadiums by capacity

Northern Ireland
Football stadiums
Football